Evolution is the fourth studio album by American R&B quartet Boyz II Men, released in September 1997. It is their final album released on Motown Records. A Spanish language version, Evolución, was also issued. The Spanish edition won the Billboard Latin Music Award for Pop Album of the Year by a New Artist.

History
On August 20, 1997, Boyz II Men held a press conference to talk about their first album since 1994's II. They were under pressure with their last two albums cumulatively selling almost 30 million copies worldwide. With Evolution, they worked with their regular collaborators, including Jimmy Jam and Terry Lewis and Babyface. They appeared on many talk shows including The Rosie O'Donnell Show, The Oprah Winfrey Show, The Tonight Show with Jay Leno, The Vibe Show, The Keenen Ivory Wayans Show and MTV Live.

The album was released on September 23, and that night, Boyz II Men signed copies of the album at the Virgin Megastore in New York City. Evolution debuted at number one in the Billboard 200 with 215,000 copies sold in its first week of release. The album also debuted at number one on the R&B Album Charts. However, the album spent only one week at the number-one spot and quickly fell down the charts. Evolution sold two million copies in the United States and over four million copies worldwide, a disappointment compared with the successes of Cooleyhighharmony and II. Evolution was not received well by critics. In October 1998, Boyz II Men went to Japan and Europe to promote the album, and during that year they embarked on the Evolution Tour.

Singles
The first single released from the album, "4 Seasons of Loneliness", was released on September 8, 1997. The song was Boyz II Men's highest debut on the Billboard Hot 100 Singles. It debuted at number two, behind Mariah Carey's "Honey". The following week, the single went to number one, became their fifth (and to date, last) chart-topper. 4 Seasons of Loneliness became Boyz II Men's sixth platinum single. Later that year, the second single, "A Song for Mama", was released, a track which already appeared on the Soul Food and its soundtrack The single reached number seven on the Billboard Hot 100 and number one on the R&B Singles Chart, making Boyz II Men the only group in history to have seven platinum singles in the United States.

Track listing

Spanish version
 "4 Estaciones De Soledad (4 Seasons of Loneliness)"
 "A Mi Me Va Bien (Doin' Just Fine)"
 "Te Doy Mi Amor (I Can Love You)"
 "La Chica De La Revista (Girl in the Life Magazine)"
 "Una Canción Para Mamá (A Song for Mama)"
 "Yo Te Voy a Amar (I'll Make Love to You)"
 "No Dejemos Que Muera el Amor (Water Runs Dry)"
 "Me Rindo Ante Ti (On Bended Knee)"
 "Yesterday (Spanish Version)"
 "Al Final Del Camino (End of the Road)"
Notes
  denotes co-producer

Charts

Weekly charts

Year-end charts

Singles

Certifications

See also
List of number-one albums of 1997 (U.S.)
List of number-one R&B albums of 1997 (U.S.)

References

External links
  / VEVO official channel
  / VEVO official channel
 

1997 albums
Boyz II Men albums
Albums produced by Jimmy Jam and Terry Lewis
Motown albums